The Go-Go's is a 2020 American-Irish-Canadian documentary film directed and produced by Alison Ellwood. The film follows the rise of the girl band The Go-Go's.

The film premiered at the 2020 Sundance Film Festival on January 24, 2020, followed by its release in the United States on June 30, 2020, by Showtime. It runs for 97 minutes.

Synopsis 
The Go-Go's become the first successful, all-girl band to write their own songs and play their own instruments while making it to No. 1 on the charts. The Go-Go's follows the rise of a band starting from the LA punk scene.

Interviewees

Critical reception 
The website's critics consensus reads: "Emulating the spirit of punk in form and function, The Go-Go's is a raucous celebration of the pioneering band and a stylistic knockout that will blow viewers' hair back." 

Top reviewers ranging from Rolling Stone to the Washington Post to NPR to the Wall Street Journal write that all potential viewers with the slightest interest in the band should watch this film, and even if viewers do not like the musical band the Go Go's, they will still like the film. They praise it for the candor that the members of the band bring to their contemporary interviews.

References

External links 
 
 
 

2020 films
2020 documentary films
2020s English-language films
American documentary films
Documentary films about musical groups
Documentary films about women in music
Rockumentaries
Showtime (TV network) documentary films
2020s American films
The Go-Go's